Albos may refer to:

 David Albós Cavaliere (b. 1984), Andorran ski mountaineer, and road racing cyclist
 Joan Albós Cavaliere (b. 1980), Andorran ski mountaineer
 Ludovic Albós Cavaliere (b. 1979), Andorran ski mountaineer

See also
Albo (disambiguation)